Obwarzanek (plural obwarzanki), or sometimes obarzanek, is a kind of Polish bagel. The name derives from the processing step obwarzanie (parboiling), or dipping in the boiling water. A Russian cognate is baranka.

Notable types
Obwarzanek krakowski has the status of a regional food with protected geographical indication.

Obwarzanek krakowski
, the type manufactured in Żarki.
Obwarzanek pobiedrski (the name comes from the former willage or Pobiedr, now part of Paszkówska.
Obwarzanki tomaszowskie (manufactured in Tomaszów Mazowiecki)

See also

References

Polish cuisine
Street food
Sweet breads
Yeast breads